Chad Mark Reed (born 15 March 1982, in Kurri Kurri, Australia) is an Australian motocross and supercross racer. He is a multi-time champion record holder for the most main event starts in AMA Supercross history, with 265 starts as of 21 June 2020, his career spanning almost 20 years. He was taught from a young age to be capable of competing at the sport's most elite level. He has proven to be the most consistent supercross/motocross racer in the 2000–2009 decade and has grown to be one of the sport's most loved individuals, due to his years of experience and dedication to his sport. He has since ascended the international ranks of the sport to become Australia's most successful motocross racer.

Amateur career 
As a small child, Chad owned a horse named Fern. After his cousin Craig Anderson started riding a bike, Chad instantly discovered his love for motorcycles and decided to trade in his much-loved horse in place for his first-ever bike - a Yamaha PW50. The family soon purchased a small property located just outside of Kurri Kurri in NSW. The 25-acre property was overgrown with thick bushland and was yet to even have a house or electricity on the land. The family went to the property to clear the tea tree shrubs by hand at any spare chance they could find, which resulted in the family home being built along with several tracks for Chad to practice on.
Chad's family supported him along the way in his early years of competition. Without fail, weekend after weekend, his Dad Mark, his Mom Robyn, and his younger brother Troy, spent the majority of their time traveling around Australia so that Chad could compete against the rest of the country. Chad was often dubbed the 'underdog', but that was certainly something that would change in the future. Honing in on his skills on 80cc bikes, Chad's amateur career started to take off in 1997 when he took the top spot at the Australian Junior Championship.

Australian career

1998-2000 
Reed formally began his professional career in Australia in 1998. He emerged from the Australian junior ranks to compete in the then-premier 250cc class, bypassing the traditional stepping stone of 125cc racing. Reed was immediately competitive in both motocross and supercross, winning the Australian 250cc Supercross Championship in 1999 and 2000.

=== 2007 === 
Reed revisited his home in Australia to race the Raymond Terrace, round 4, of the Australian Motocross series. He beat Daniel Reardon with a 1-1 performance, providing Reardon with international notoriety for holding Reed off for a significant portion of the races.

2008 
In 2008 Reed was responsible for developing and partially funding the new Australian Supercross Championships, dubbed Super-X. He also competed in the series and dominated all but one race to take the Australian Supercross Championship. Reed won 6 out of the 7 races.

2009 
Chad Reed, aboard his new Monster Energy Kawasaki KX-450F, won 4 out of the 7 rounds of the series. Reed won the championship by beating Daniel Reardon by 23 points. This is Reed's fourth Australian Supercross Championship.

2010 
Reed raced the first round of the 2010 Super X series held at Energy Australia Stadium, Newcastle on a Honda sponsored by Vodafone. Reed won the event beating Americans Josh Hansen and Justin Brayton who finished in second and third respectively.

International career

2001 
Reed travelled to Europe in 2001 to compete in the FIM World 250ccc Motocross Championships, riding for Jan DeGroot's factory Kawasaki team. Reed was a revelation aboard his KX250, winning the Grand Prix of Lierop (Netherlands) and eventually finishing the year second to multi-time World Champion Mickaël Pichon. He is the first Australian to win a world 250cc GP race.

2002 
Reed moved to the US in 2002 and picked up a ride with Yamaha of Troy. Reed won all but two supercross races that season to win the 125cc East Coast Supercross championship.

Reed won his first and only 125cc National victory at Mount Morris, PA, and finishing the season third behind James Stewart Jr. and Branden Jesseman.
Reeds first-ever SX race was in San Diego CA

2003 
Reed moved to the 250cc class in 2003 riding for Factory Yamaha. In his rookie 250cc Supercross season Reed finished second to chief rival Ricky Carmichael, losing the title by only 7 points to Carmichael despite winning 8 races to Carmichael's 7.

Reed finished his first 250cc Motocross season a distant third behind Carmichael and Kevin Windham.

2004 
In 2004 Reed won the 2004 AMA 250cc Supercross series, battling with Kevin Windham, Michael Byrne and Tim Ferry with Reed earning 10 victories for the season.

Reed finished 2nd to Carmichael in that year's motocross season.

2005 
2005 marked the much-anticipated entry of James Stewart to the 250cc class alongside Reed and Carmichael. Each scored multiple wins making for an exciting season but again it was Carmichael winning the championship with 7 wins over Reed in 2nd with 5 wins and Stewart in 3rd with 3 wins.

2006 
In 2006 Reed was again very competitive despite suffering a level three shoulder separation in mid-season which hampered his ability to compete to his highest ability. Going into the final event of the season, Reed and Carmichael were tied for the points lead, making the 2006 season the closest AMA Supercross championship in history. Reed took third place that night to Carmichael's second, narrowly losing the 2006 AMA Supercross title to Carmichael by only two points. Reed won 2 races that season. Reed was in 2nd in the AMA Nationals until he had to withdraw from the Nationals after the Millville round, citing the recurrent shoulder injury.

2007 
For 2007 Reed announced his plans to leave the factory Yamaha team to form his own private team, similar to Jeremy McGrath in the past. Obtaining support from Yamaha, The San Manuel Band of Mission Indians, Thor and Nike, even brought in McGrath's former team manager Larry Brooks to spearhead the new effort, dubbed L&M Racing. Reed took 1 win for the season and finished 2nd in the title chase to James Stewart Jr.

2008 
In 2008 Reed won 9 out of 14 races in the AMA Supercross season to edge out Kevin Windham and win the AMA Supercross title for the second time. This was a season full of great battles with Reed duking it out against Davi Millsaps, Kevin Windham, and Josh Hill for race wins, with Reed, in the end, winning the championship by 13 points over Kevin Windham.

2009 
Reed joined team Rockstar Makita Suzuki for the 2009 season. Reed battled hard with his rival James Stewart Jr. during the 2009 AMA supercross championship, with the pair coming to blows on more than one occasion. He narrowly lost the title to Stewart by 4 points. Reed won 3 races this season.

Reed elected to race the 2009 motocross season after a 2-year hiatus. He won the AMA Motocross Championship at round ten, out of the 12 round series. He also won the Monster Energy Triple Crown Championship during the motocross season. He won 5 out of the 12 races in this season.

2010 
For the 2010 season, Reed joined new teammate Ryan Villopoto riding the KX-450F for the Monster Energy Kawasaki Racing Team. Reed failed to finish during the round one final due to a collision with another racer's footpeg, breaking spokes in his front wheel. During round two he collided with James Stewart Jr. in the final, breaking his hand resulting in another DNF. Reed returned to race round 13 of the supercross series, and despite having a bad start, Reed finished fourth. Chad Reed withdrew from the competition stating he has Epstein-Barr virus. In an open letter published on his website, Reed admits that becoming a new dad and also the death of his close personal friend Andrew McFarlane may be reasons people look to for his poor performance.

2011 
After racing & winning the first round of Super X in Newcastle, Australia in October, Reed returned to the US to test various bikes and teams searching for a suitable 2011 team structure. Reed embraced social media using Twitter to publish hints as to the likely brand of bike and apparel that he would be using in the 2011 AMA Supercross series. Failing negotiations with established teams, Reed decided to create his own team, TwoTwo Motorsports, aboard a Honda CRF450R, with support from Honda, Bel-Ray, Shift and many other sponsors.
The 2011 season had been a 5-way battle between Reed, Ryan Villopoto, James Stewart Jr., Ryan Dungey and Trey Canard. It came down to the final race in Las Vegas between Ryan Villopoto, Reed, and Ryan Dungey. Reed won the Las Vegas race but lost the championship by 4 points to Ryan Villopoto. Reed was presented with the "2011 Rock Hard - Ride Hard Bret Michaels Supercross Award." at Vegas for his great work starting a new team and still finishing 2nd in the championship.

2012 
While competing at the seventh round of the 2012 AMA Supercross series in Dallas Texas and going in an Epic Battle with Ryan Villopoto, Reed crashed and sustained numerous injuries including his left knee. The most serious of the injuries required surgery for a torn ACL. Consequently, Reed was forced to drop out of the 2012 title chase while sitting second in overall championship points.

2013 
After the long hiatus, Reed returned to racing with his new bike and a new sponsor, Discount Tire, but he kept his TwoTwo Motorsports Honda. While battling with Ryan Villopoto, Davi Millsaps, Ryan Dungey, Trey Canard , and Justin Barcia, Reed struggled to ride hard and pass for the lead. On 23 March 2013, after the race in Toronto, Canada Reed announced that he underwent knee surgery on Tuesday, and missed one round of competition in Houston, Texas. He came back in Minneapolis to race, however, in the Main Event in Seattle. Reed crashed in the first corner, where he tweaked his right arm. He came back to Salt Lake City, but had problems with his engine, putting him in the LCQ. In the Main Event in Salt Lake City, he was lapped by the leaders Ryan Villopoto, Davi Millsaps, and Ryan Dungey on Lap 16, and finishing in 10th Place.

2014 
After a disappointing 2013 season, finishing twice on the podium, one in Anaheim 2, and the other in St. Louis, Reed returned to racing. He switched brands from Honda to Kawasaki, but he continued to ride for his own team TwoTwo Motorsports and for Discount Tire. Throughout the season, Reed continued to struggle and ride a new bike. He finished 3rd in the Season Opener in Anaheim. He got back up passed Ken Roczen for 2nd place and then James Stewart Jr. for the lead, and won the 3rd round in Anaheim 2, and got back up leading all 20 laps and won the 5th Round in Anaheim 3. While competing at Round 6 at Qualcomm Stadium in San Diego, Reed crashed hard in the whoops on the Final Lap after clipping Ken Roczen's rear wheel as he tried to take over 3rd place and then suffered a shoulder injury. He tried to race in Arlington, Texas during qualifying practice and his shoulder is getting worse due to a broken collarbone. Consequently, Reed was forced to drop out the remainder of the 10 rounds of the 2014 AMA Supercross Series while sitting second in overall championship points. In the Lucas Oil MX Series, he finished around 10th overall in the points and won 2 holeshots.

2015 
In 2015 Chad Reed would see one of his most disappointing professional seasons earning one win in the Supercross Championship along with 2 podium finishes. He would withdraw from the AMA Motocross championship midway through the season due to motocross competing sponsorship reasons. He would later announce the folding of his TwoTwo Motorsports Team that was founded in 2011. Reed would later announce that he would be riding a Yamaha for the continuation of the 15' Season and for the 2015 Monster Energy Cup.

2016 
In 2016, Reed competed in the 2016 AMA Monster Energy Supercross Championship with Factory Yamaha. His sponsors include Yamaha Motor Corporation, Monster Energy, Yamalube, Chaparral Motorsports, Yamaha Financial Services, Oakley Motorsports, and Pro Circuit.

2018 
Chad Reed obtained the world record for the most career Monster Energy Supercross main event starts ever.

2019 
On 2 February, He finished Top Five (5th place) at the AMA Monster Energy Supercross in San Diego, CA. On 23 February, Reed finished on the podium in 3rd in the AMA Monster Energy Supercross in Detroit, MI, Increasing his record of most all-time AMA Supercross podiums to 132. On 23 March, He crashed at the start of the main event during the Seattle, WA supercross event. He sustained multiple injuries including a broken scapula, 8 rib fractures, and a collapsed lung ending his 2019 supercross season.

2020
In the previous year, Reed had announced that 2020 would be his last season. Midway through the year after the break caused by COVID 19, Reed switched from Honda to KTM. His best finish in 2020 was a 10th at the finale.

Sponsorships 

Reed has ridden for a variety of sponsors over his career, including: Yamaha Motor Company, Husqvarna, Monster Energy, Red Bull, Oakley Motorsports, Fox Racing, Shift, Discount Tire, Boost Mobile, Pro Circuit, 360 Fly Camera and Penrite Oil Company.

Recognition 
 1997 Australian Junior Motocross Champion
 1999 Australian Supercross Champion
 2000 Australian Supercross Champion
 2001 Motocross of Nations (Belgium) - Race 2 (125/250), 1st Place
 2002 AMA Eastern Regional Supercross Champion
 2003 U.S Open Champion
 2003 FIM World Supercross GP Champion
 2004 U.S Open Champion
 2004 AMA Supercross Champion
 2005 X-Games Supermoto - Bronze Medal
 2007 King of Bercy Supercross Champion
 2007 Motocross of Nations (USA) - Race 1 (MX1/MX2), 2nd Place
 2008 AMA/FIM World Supercross Champion
 2008 Australian Supercross Champion
 2009 Monster Energy Triple Crown Motocross Champion
 2009 AMA National Pro Motocross Champion
 2009 Motocross of Nations (Italy) - Race 1 (MX1/MX2), 2nd Place
 2009 AMA Athlete of the Year
 2009 Australian Supercross Champion
 2011 Motocross of Nations (France) - Race 1 (MX1/MX2), 1st Place
 2016 AUS-X Open Champion
 2018 The Ironman of Supercross (Most AMA Supercross Starts Record)
 2018 SX-Open Champion
 2018 FIM Oceania Supercross Champion

Honours
On 13 June 2011, Reed was awarded a Member of the Order of Australia for service to motorsports as a professional supercross motorcycle rider at national and international levels, and to the community.

MARK REED TALKS EARLY DAYS IN THE SUPER X SERIES

https://transmoto.com.au/mark-reed-talks-early-days-in-the-super-x-series/

References

1982 births
Living people
Sportsmen from New South Wales
Australian motocross riders
AMA Motocross Championship National Champions
Members of the Order of Australia